Maja Gojković (born 22 May 1963) is a Serbian politician serving as deputy prime minister of Serbia and minister of culture and information since 2020. A member of the Serbian Progressive Party (SNS), she previously served as president of the National Assembly from 2014 to 2020.

As a member of the Serbian Radical Party (SRS), she served as minister without portfolio from 1998 to 1999 and deputy prime minister of Yugoslavia from 1999 to 2000. She later became the mayor of Novi Sad, an office she served from 2004 to 2008, after which she left SRS and formed the People's Party (NP) which merged into SNS in 2012.

Education
She attended Branko Radičević elementary school and the Gymnasium Jovan Jovanović Zmaj. After getting her degree from the University of Novi Sad Faculty of Law in 1987, she passed the bar exam in 1989. A year later she started working in her family's law firm.

Political career

Gojković is one of the founders of Serbian Radical Party, first holding the position of secretary general, then vice president of executive council and finally she was vice president of the party. She was Vojislav Šešelj's legal adviser before the International Criminal Tribunal for the former Yugoslavia.

On 14 July 1995, during the Bosnian War, Gojković, who served as vice-president of Serbian Radical Party, made a statement on the Fall of Srebrenica only a few days after the start of the massacre: “We salute the rapidly action of the Army of Republika Srpska, which finally liberated Serbian Srebrenica and put an end to one of the most significant hotspot of Muslim terror.”

Maja Gojković has been a representative in the parliament of the Federal Republic of Yugoslavia since 1992. From 1996 until 2000 she was a member of Vojvodina parliament. In 1998 and 1999 she was a non-portfolio minister in the Serbian Government. Gojković also served as vice chairman of the federal government of FR Yugoslavia in 1999. Before running for mayor of Novi Sad she held a place in the federal parliament of Serbia and Montenegro. She was the vice president of the Serbian Radical Party until 2006. In 2008, she formed her own party, the People's Party and ran for seats in the local elections. She got seven councillor seats in the Parliament of Novi Sad. In 2010, the People's Party joined the United Regions of Serbia (URS). For having supporting a coalition with Boris Tadić and his Democratic Party independently of the People's Party, she and other such members were expelled from the URS. The party is now defunct and she is a member of the ruling Serbian Progressive Party.

In the 2004 Serbian local election she was elected Mayor of Novi Sad, for the first time by popular vote, beating then mayor Borislav Novaković. She thus became the first woman to perform mayoral duties in Novi Sad's history.

She was elected President of the National Assembly of Serbia on 23 April 2014. In 2018, Freedom House reported that Gojković conducted parliamentary proceedings in an extremely partisan way, with a huge number of interruptions and penalties handed to opposition MPs. In addition, she was criticized for suggesting to MPs from ruling coalition to vote for initiatives and proposals by ringing a bell.

On 27 June 2020, Gojković was hospitalized with COVID-19.

References

1963 births
Living people
Presidents of the National Assembly (Serbia)
Serbian Radical Party politicians
People's Party (Serbia, 2008) politicians
Serbian Progressive Party politicians
Politicians of Vojvodina
20th-century Serbian lawyers
Serbian women lawyers
Mayors of Novi Sad
Women mayors of places in Serbia
University of Novi Sad alumni
Deputy Prime Ministers of Serbia
Government ministers of Serbia
Women government ministers of Serbia
Women members of the National Assembly (Serbia)